Dexter by the Sea is a small unincorporated community, adjacent to Tokeland, in Pacific County, Washington, United States.

References

Unincorporated communities in Washington (state)
Unincorporated communities in Pacific County, Washington